David Jordan may refer to:

 David K. Jordan (born 1942), professor emeritus at University of California, San Diego
 David Jordan (singer) (born 1985), British singer
 David Starr Jordan (1851–1931), president of Indiana University and Stanford University
 David C. Jordan (born 1935), U.S. Ambassador to Peru
 David Charles Jordan (born 1949), New Brunswick, Canada politician
 David J. Jordan, US Attorney for the District of Utah, 1991–1993
 Davy Jordan (1908–1989), Irish footballer
 David Lee Jordan (born 1934), Democratic member of the Mississippi Senate
 David Jordan (rugby union), former CEO of the Scottish rugby union club Glasgow Warriors
 Dave Jordan (footballer) (born 1971), English footballer